Fujian  (alternately romanized as Fukien or Hokkien) is a province on the southeastern coast of China. Fujian is bordered by Zhejiang to the north, Jiangxi to the west, Guangdong to the south, and the Taiwan Strait to the east. Its capital is Fuzhou, while its largest city by population is Quanzhou, both located near the coast of the Taiwan Strait in the east of the province.

While its population is predominantly of Chinese ethnicity, it is one of the most culturally and linguistically diverse provinces in China. The dialects of the language group Min Chinese were most commonly spoken within the province, including the Fuzhou dialect of northeastern Fujian and various Hokkien dialects of southeastern Fujian. Hakka Chinese is also spoken, by the Hakka people in Fujian. Min dialects, Hakka and Mandarin Chinese are mutually unintelligible. Due to emigration, a sizable amount of the ethnic Chinese populations of Taiwan, Singapore, Malaysia, Indonesia, and the Philippines speak Southern Min (or Hokkien).

With a population of 41.5 million, Fujian ranks 15th in population among Chinese provinces. As of 2021, Fujian's GDP (nominal) reached 768 billion US dollars (CNY 4.88 trillion), ranking 4th in East China region and 8th nationwide in GDP. Fujian's GDP per capita is above the national average, at CN¥117,500 (approx.US$28,658 in PPP), the second highest GDP per capita of all Chinese provinces after Jiangsu. It has benefited from its geographical proximity with Taiwan. As a result of the Chinese Civil War, a small proportion of Historical Fujian is now within the Republic of China (ROC, Taiwan). The Fujian province of the ROC consist of three offshore archipelagos namely the Kinmen Islands, the Matsu Islands and the Wuqiu Islands.

Fujian is considered one of China's leading provinces in education and research. As of 2022, two major cities ranked in the top 65 cities in the world (Fuzhou 50th and Xiamen 63rd) by scientific research output, as tracked by the Nature Index.

Name 
The name Fujian (福建) originated from the combination of the city names of Fuzhou (福州) and nearby Jianzhou (建州 present-day Nanping (南平)).

History

Prehistoric Fujian
Recent archaeological discoveries in 2011 demonstrate that Fujian had entered the Neolithic Age by the middle of the 6th millennium BC.

The Tanshishan site (5500–4000 BP) in suburban Fuzhou spans the Neolithic and Chalcolithic Age where semi-underground circular buildings were found in the lower level. The Huangtulun site (ca.1325 BC), also in suburban Fuzhou, was of the Bronze Age in character.

Tianlong Jiao (2013) notes that the Neolithic appeared on the coast of Fujian around 6,000 B.P. During the Neolithic, the coast of Fujian had a low population density, with the population depending on mostly on fishing and hunting, along with limited agriculture.

There were four major Neolithic cultures in coastal Fujian, with the earliest Neolithic cultures originating from the north in coastal Zhejiang.
Keqiutou culture (c. 6000–5500 BP, or c. 4050–3550 BC)
Tanshishan culture (c. 5000–4300 BP, or c. 3050–2350 BC)
Damaoshan culture (c. 5000–4300 BP)
Huangguashan culture (c. 4300–3500 BP, or c. 2350–1550 BC)

There were two major Neolithic cultures in inland Fujian, which were highly distinct from the coastal Fujian Neolithic cultures. These are the Niubishan culture from 5000 to 4000 years ago, and the Hulushan culture from 2050 to 1550 BC.

Minyue kingdom

Fujian was also where the kingdom of Minyue was located. The word "Mǐnyuè" was derived by combining "Mǐn", which is perhaps an ethnic name, and "Yuè", after the State of Yue, a Spring and Autumn period kingdom in Zhejiang to the north. This is because the royal family of Yuè fled to Fujian after its kingdom was annexed by the State of Chu in 306 BC. Mǐn is also the name of the main river in this area, but the ethnonym is probably older.

Qin dynasty
The Qin deposed the King of Minyue, establishing instead a paramilitary province there called Minzhong Commandery. Minyue was a de facto kingdom until one of the emperors of the Qin dynasty, the first unified imperial Chinese state, abolished its status.

Han dynasty

In the aftermath of the Qin dynasty's fall, civil war broke out between two warlords, Xiang Yu and Liu Bang. The Minyue king Wuzhu sent his troops to fight with Liu and his gamble paid off. Liu was victorious and founded the Han dynasty. In 202 BC, he restored Minyue's status as a tributary independent kingdom. Thus Wuzhu was allowed to construct his fortified city in Fuzhou as well as a few locations in the Wuyi Mountains, which have been excavated in recent years. His kingdom extended beyond the borders of contemporary Fujian into eastern Guangdong, eastern Jiangxi, and southern Zhejiang.

After Wuzhu's death, Minyue maintained its militant tradition and launched several expeditions against its neighboring kingdoms in Guangdong, Jiangxi, and Zhejiang, primarily in the 2nd century BC. This was stopped by the Han dynasty as it expanded southward. The Han emperor eventually decided to get rid of the potential threat by launching a military campaign against Minyue. Large forces approached Minyue simultaneously from four directions via land and sea in 111 BC. The rulers in Fuzhou surrendered to avoid a futile fight and destruction and the first kingdom in Fujian history came to an abrupt end.

Fujian was part of the much larger Yang Province (Yangzhou), whose provincial capital was designated in Liyang (歷陽; present-day He County, Anhui).

The Han dynasty collapsed at the end of the 2nd century AD, paving the way for the Three Kingdoms era. Sun Quan, the founder of the Kingdom of Wu, spent nearly 20 years subduing the Shan Yue people, the branch of the Yue living in mountains.

Jin era
The first wave of immigration of the noble class arrived in the province in the early 4th century when the Western Jin dynasty collapsed and the north was torn apart by invasions by nomadic peoples from the north, as well as a civil war. These immigrants were primarily from eight families in central China: 

Nevertheless, isolation from nearby areas owing to rugged terrain contributed to Fujian's relatively undeveloped economy and level of development, despite major population boosts from northern China during the "barbarian" invasions. The population density in Fujian remained low compared to the rest of China. Only two commanderies and sixteen counties were established by the Western Jin dynasty. Like other southern provinces such as Guangdong, Guangxi, Guizhou, and Yunnan, Fujian often served as a destination for exiled prisoners and dissidents at that time.

During the Southern and Northern Dynasties era, the Southern Dynasties (Liu Song, Southern Qi, Liang (Western Liang), and Chen) reigned south of the Yangtze River, including Fujian.

Sui and Tang dynasties

During the Sui and Tang eras a large influx of migrants settled in Fujian.

During the Sui dynasty, Fujian was again part of Yang Province.

During the Tang, Fujian was part of the larger Jiangnan East Circuit, whose capital was at Suzhou. Modern-day Fujian was composed of around 5 prefectures and 25 counties.

The Tang dynasty (618–907) oversaw the next golden age of China, which contributed to a boom in Fujian's culture and economy. Fuzhou's economic and cultural institutions grew and developed. The later years of the Tang dynasty saw several political upheavals in the Chinese heartland, prompting even larger waves of northerners to immigrate to the northern part of Fujian.

Five Dynasties Ten Kingdoms
As the Tang dynasty ended, China was torn apart in the period of the Five Dynasties and Ten Kingdoms. During this time, a second major wave of immigration arrived in the safe haven of Fujian, led by General Wang, who set up an independent Kingdom of Min with its capital in Fuzhou. After the death of the founding king, however, the kingdom suffered from internal strife, and was soon absorbed by Southern Tang, another southern kingdom.

Parts of northern Fujian were conquered by the Wuyue Kingdom to the north as well, including the Min capital Fuzhou.

Quanzhou city was blooming into a seaport under the reign of the Min Kingdom and was the largest seaport in the world. For a long period its population was also greater than Fuzhou.

Qingyuan Jiedushi was a military/governance office created in 949 by Southern Tang's second emperor Li Jing for the warlord Liu Congxiao, who nominally submitted to him but controlled Quan (in modern Quanzhou, Fujian) and Zhang (in modern Zhangzhou, Fujian) Prefectures in de facto independence from the Southern Tang state.  (Zhang Prefecture was, at times during the circuit's existence, also known as Nan Prefecture.)  Starting in 960, in addition to being nominally submissive to Southern Tang, Qingyuan Circuit was also nominally submissive to Song, which had itself become Southern Tang's nominal overlord.

After Liu's death, the circuit was briefly ruled by his biological nephew/adoptive son Liu Shaozi, who was then overthrown by the officers Zhang Hansi and Chen Hongjin.  Zhang then ruled the circuit briefly, before Chen deposed him and took over.  In 978, with Song's determination to unify Chinese lands in full order, Chen decided that he could not stay de facto independent, and offered the control of the circuit to Song's Emperor Taizong, ending Qingyuan Circuit as a de facto independent entity.

Song dynasty
The area was reorganized into the Fujian Circuit in 985, which was the first time the name "Fujian" was used for an administrative region.

Vietnam
Many Chinese migrated from Fujian's major ports to Vietnam's Red River Delta. The settlers then created Trần port and Vân Đồn. Fujian and Guangdong Chinese moved to the Vân Đồn coastal port to engage in commerce.

During the Lý and Trần dynasties, many Chinese ethnic groups with the surname Trần (陳) migrated to Vietnam from what is now Fujian or Guangxi. They settled along the coast of Vietnam and the capital's southeastern area. The Vietnamese Trần clan traces their ancestry to Trần Tự Minh (227 BC). He was a Qin General during the Warring state period who belonged to the indigenous Mân, a Baiyue ethnic group of Southern China and Northern Vietnam. Tự Minh also served under King An Dương Vương of Âu Lạc kingdom in resisting Qin's conquest of Âu Lạc. Their genealogy also included Trần Tự Viễn (582 - 637) of Giao Châu and Trần Tự An (1010 - 1077) of Đại Việt. Near the end of the 11th century the descendants of a fisherman named Trần Kinh, whose hometown was in Tức Mạc village in Đại Việt (Modern day Vietnam), would marry the royal Lý clan, which was then founded the Vietnam Tran Dynasty in the year 1225.

In Vietnam, the Trần served as officials. The surnames are found in the Trần and Lý dynasty Imperial exam records. Chinese ethnic groups are recorded in Trần and Lý dynasty records of officials. Clothing, food, and languages were fused with the local Vietnamese in Vân Đồn district where the Chinese ethnic groups had moved after leaving their home province of what is now Fujian, Guangxi, and Guangdong.

In 1172, Fujian was attacked by Pi-she-ye pirates from Taiwan or the Visayas, Philippines.

Yuan dynasty
After the establishment of the Yuan dynasty, Fujian became part of Jiangzhe province, whose capital was at Hangzhou. From 1357 to 1366 Muslims in Quanzhou participated in the Ispah Rebellion, advancing northward and even capturing Putian and Fuzhou before the rebellion was crushed by the Yuan. Afterward, Quanzhou city lost foreign interest in trading and its formerly welcoming international image as the foreigners were all massacred or deported.

Yuan dynasty General Chen Youding, who had put down the Ispah Rebellion, continued to rule over the Fujian area even after the outbreak of the Red Turban Rebellion. Forces loyal to the eventual Ming dynasty founder Zhu Yuanzhang (Hongwu Emperor) defeated Chen in 1367.

Ming dynasty
After the establishment of the Ming dynasty, Fujian became a province, with its capital at Fuzhou. In the early Ming era, Fuzhou Changle was the staging area and supply depot of Zheng He's naval expeditions. Further development was severely hampered by the sea trade ban, and the area was superseded by nearby ports of Guangzhou, Hangzhou, Ningbo and Shanghai despite the lifting of the ban in 1550. Large-scale piracy by Wokou was eventually wiped out by the Chinese military.

An account of the Ming dynasty Fujian was written by No In (Lu Ren ).

The Pisheya appear in Quanzhou Ming era records.

Qing dynasty
The late Ming and early Qing dynasty symbolized an era of a large influx of refugees and another 20 years of sea trade ban under the Kangxi Emperor, a measure intended to counter the refuge Ming government of Koxinga in the island of Taiwan.

The sea ban implemented by the Qing forced many people to evacuate the coast to deprive Koxinga's Ming loyalists of resources. This has led to the myth that it was because Manchus were "afraid of water".

Incoming refugees did not translate into a major labor force, owing to their re-migration into prosperous regions of Guangdong. In 1683, the Qing dynasty conquered Taiwan in the Battle of Penghu and annexed it into the Fujian province, as Taiwan Prefecture. Many more Han Chinese then settled in Taiwan. Today, most Taiwanese are descendants of Hokkien people from Southern Fujian. Fujian and Taiwan were originally treated as one province (Fujian-Taiwan-Province), but starting in 1885, they split into two separate provinces.

In the 1890s, the Qing ceded Taiwan to Japan via the Treaty of Shimonoseki after the First Sino-Japanese War.  In 1905-1907 Japan made overtures to enlarge its sphere of influence to include Fujian. Japan was trying to obtain French loans and also avoid the Open Door Policy. Paris provided loans on condition that Japan respects the Open Door principles and does not violate China's territorial integrity.

Republic of China

The Xinhai revolution overthrew the Qing dynasty and brought the province into the rule of the Republic of China.

Fujian briefly established the independent Fujian People's Government in 1933. It was re-controlled by the Republic of China in 1934.

Fujian came under a Japanese sea blockade during World War II.

People's Republic of China
After the Chinese Civil War, the People's Republic of China unified the country and took over most of Fujian, excluding the Quemoy and Matsu Islands.

In its early days, Fujian's development was relatively slow in comparison to other coastal provinces due to potential conflicts with Kuomintang-controlled Taiwan. Today, the province has the highest forest coverage rate while enjoying a high growth rate in the economy. The GDP per capita in Fujian is ranked 4-6th place among provinces of China in recent years.

Development has been accompanied by a large influx of population from the overpopulated areas to Fujian's north and west, and much of the farmland and forest, as well as cultural heritage sites such as the temples of king Wuzhu, have given way to ubiquitous high-rise buildings. Fujian faces challenges to sustain development while at the same time preserving Fujian's natural and cultural heritage.

Geography

The province is mostly mountainous and is traditionally said to be "eight parts mountain, one part water, and one part farmland". The northwest is higher in altitude, with the Wuyi Mountains forming the border between Fujian and Jiangxi. It is the most forested provincial-level administrative region in China, with a 62.96% forest coverage rate in 2009.

Fujian faces East China Sea to the east, South China Sea to the south, and the Taiwan Strait to the southeast. The coastline is rugged and has many bays and islands. Major islands include Quemoy (also known as Kinmen, controlled by the Republic of China), Haitan Island, and Nanri Island. Meizhou Island occupies a central place in the cult of the goddess Matsu, the patron deity of Chinese sailors.

The Min River and its tributaries cut through much of northern and central Fujian. Other rivers include the Jin and the Jiulong. Due to its uneven topography, Fujian has many cliffs and rapids.

Fujian is separated from Taiwan by the -wide Taiwan Strait. Some of the small islands in the Taiwan Strait are also part of the province. The islands of Kinmen and Matsu are under the administration of the Republic of China.

Fujian contains several faults, the result of a collision between the Asiatic Plate and the Philippine Sea Plate. The Changle-Naoao and Longan-Jinjiang fault zones in this area have annual displacement rates of 3–5 mm. They could cause major earthquakes in the future.

Fujian has a subtropical climate, with mild winters. In January, the coastal regions average around  while the hills average . In the summer, temperatures are high, and the province is threatened by typhoons coming in from the Pacific.

Transportation

Roads

The top infrastructure projects in recent years have been the Zhangzhou-Zhaoan Expressway (US$624 million) and the Sanmingshi-Fuzhou expressway (US$1.40 billion).

Railways

Due to Fujian's mountainous terrain and traditional reliance on maritime transportation, railways came to the province comparatively late. The first rail links to neighboring Jiangxi, Guangdong, and Zhejiang Province, opened respectively, in 1959, 2000, and 2009. As of October 2013, Fujian has four rail links with Jiangxi to the northwest: the Yingtan–Xiamen Railway (opened 1957), the Hengfeng–Nanping Railway (1998), Ganzhou–Longyan Railway (2005) and the high-speed Xiangtang–Putian Railway (2013). Fujian's lone rail link to Guangdong to the west, the Zhangping–Longchuan Railway (2000), will be joined with the high-speed Xiamen–Shenzhen Railway (Xiashen Line) in late 2013. The Xiashen Line forms the southernmost section of China's Southeast Coast High-Speed Rail Corridor.

Within Fujian, coastal and interior cities are linked by the Nanping–Fuzhou (1959), Zhangping–Quanzhou–Xiaocuo (2007) and Longyan–Xiamen Railways, (2012).

Air
The major airports are Fuzhou Changle International Airport, Xiamen Gaoqi International Airport, Quanzhou Jinjiang International Airport, Nanping Wuyishan Airport, Longyan Guanzhishan Airport and Sanming Shaxian Airport. Xiamen is capable of handling 15.75 million passengers as of 2011. Fuzhou is capable of handling 6.5 million passengers annually with a cargo capacity of more than 200,000 tons. The airport offers direct links to 45 destinations including international routes to Japan, Malaysia, Thailand, Singapore, and Hong Kong.

Administrative divisions

The People's Republic of China controls most of the province and divides it into nine prefecture-level divisions: all prefecture-level cities (including a sub-provincial city):

All of the prefecture-level cities except Nanping, Sanming, and Longyan are found along the coast.

These nine prefecture-level cities are subdivided into 85 county-level divisions (28 districts, 13 county-level cities, and 44 counties). Those are in turn divided into 1,107 township-level divisions (605 towns, 328 townships, 18 ethnic townships, and 156 subdistricts).

The People's Republic of China claims five of the six townships of Kinmen County, Republic of China (Taiwan) as a county of the prefecture-level city of Quanzhou.

The PRC claims Wuqiu Township, Kinmen County, Republic of China (Taiwan) as part of Xiuyu District of the prefecture-level city of Putian.

Finally, the PRC claims Lienchiang County (Matsu Islands), Republic of China (Taiwan) as a township of its Lianjiang County, which is part of the prefecture-level city of Fuzhou.

Together, these three groups of islands make up the Republic of China's Fujian Province.

Urban areas

Politics

List of provincial-level leaders

CCP Party Secretaries
Zhang Dingcheng: 1949-1954
Ye Fei: 1954-1958
Jiang Yizhen: 1958-1970
Han Xianchu: 1971-1973　
Liao Zhigao: 1974-1982
Xiang Nan: 1982-1986　
Chen Guangyi: 1986-1993　
Jia Qinglin: 1993-1996　
Chen Mingyi: 1996-2000　
Song Defu: 2000-2004
Lu Zhangong: 2004-2009　
Sun Chunlan: 2009-2012
You Quan: 2012-2017
Yu Weiguo: 2017-2020
Yin Li: 2020-2022
Zhou Zuyi: 2022–present

Chairpersons of Fujian People's Congress
Liao Zhigao: 1979-1982
Hu Hong: 1982-1985
Cheng Xu: 1985-1993
Chen Guangyi: 1993-1994
Jia Qinglin: 1994-1998
 Yuan Qitong: 1998-2002
Song Defu: 2002-2005
Lu Zhangong: 2005-2010
Sun Chunlan: 2010-2013
You Quan: 2013-2018
Yu Weiguo: 2018-2021
Yin Li: 2021–present

Governors
Zhang Dingcheng: 1949-1954
Ye Fei: 1954-1959
Jiang Yizhen: 1959
Wu Hongxiang: acting: 1960-1962
Jiang Yizhen: 1962
Wei Jinshui: 1962-1967
Han Xianchu: 1967-1973
Liao Zhigao: 1974-1979
Ma Xingyuan: 1979-1983
Hu Ping: 1983-1987
Wang Zhaoguo: 1987–1990　
Jia Qinglin: 1990–1994　
Chen Mingyi: 1994–1996　
He Guoqiang: 1996–1999　
Xi Jinping: 1999–2002　
Lu Zhangong: 2002–2004
Huang Xiaojing: 2004–2011
Su Shulin: 2011–2015
Yu Weiguo: 2015–2018
Tang Dengjie: 2018–2020
Wang Ning: 2020–2021
Zhao Long: 2021–present

Economy

Fujian is one of the more affluent provinces with many industries spanning tea production, clothing, and sports manufacturers such as Anta, 361 Degrees, Xtep, Peak Sport Products and Septwolves. Many foreign firms have operations in Fujian. They include Boeing, Dell, GE, Kodak, Nokia, Siemens, Swire, TDK, and Panasonic.

As of 2021, Fujian's nominal GDP was CNY 4.88 trillion (US$768 billion), ranking 8th in GDP nationwide and appearing in the world's top 20 largest sub-national economies with its GDP (Purchasing Power Parity) being over US$1.19 trillion. Along with its coastal neighbours Zhejiang and Guangdong, Fujian's GDP per capita is above the national average, at CN¥117,500 (approx.US$18,217 in nominal value and US$28,658 in Purchasing Power Parity), the second highest GDP per capita of all Chinese provinces after Jiangsu.

As of 2021, Fujian's nominal GDP exceeded that of Poland with a GDP of US$674 billion, the 21st largest in the world.

In terms of agricultural land, Fujian is hilly and farmland is sparse. Rice is the main crop, supplemented by sweet potatoes and wheat and barley. Cash crops include sugar cane and rapeseed. Fujian leads the provinces of China in longan production, and is also a major producer of lychees and tea. Seafood is another important product, with shellfish production especially prominent.

Because of its geographic location with Taiwan, Fujian has been considered the battlefield frontline in a potential war between mainland China and Taiwan. Hence, it received much less investment from the Chinese central government and developed much slower than the rest of China before 1978. Since 1978, when China opened to the world, Fujian has received significant investment from overseas Fujianese around the world, Taiwanese and foreign investment.

Minnan Golden Triangle which includes Xiamen, Quanzhou, and Zhangzhou accounts for 40 percent of the GDP of Fujian province.

Fujian province will be the major economic beneficiary of the opening up of direct transport with Taiwan which commenced on December 15, 2008. This includes direct flights from Taiwan to major Fujian cities such as Xiamen and Fuzhou. In addition, ports in Xiamen, Quanzhou, and Fuzhou will upgrade their port infrastructure for increased economic trade with Taiwan.

Fujian is the host of China International Fair for Investment and Trade annually. It is held in Xiamen to promote foreign investment for all of China.

Economic and Technological Development Zones

Dongshan Economic and Technology Development Zone
 Fuzhou Economic & Technical Development Zone
 Fuzhou Free Trade Zone
 Fuzhou Hi-Tech Park
 Fuzhou Taiwan Merchant Investment Area
 Jimei Taiwan Merchant Investment Area
 Meizhou Island National Tourist Holiday Resort
 Wuyi Mountain National Tourist Holiday Resort
 Xiamen Export Processing Zone
 Xiamen Free Trade Zone
 Xiamen Haicang Economic and Technological Development Zone
 Xiamen Torch New & Hi-Tech Industrial Development Zone (Chinese version)
Xinglin Taiwan Merchant Investment Area

Demographics

As of 1832, the province was described as having an estimated "population of fourteen millions."

Fujianese who are legally classified as Han Chinese make up 98% of the population. Various Min Chinese speakers make up the largest subgroups classified as Han Chinese in Fujian such as Hoklo people, Fuzhounese people, Putian people and Fuzhou Tanka.

Hakka, a Han Chinese people with their own distinct identity, live in the central and southwestern parts of Fujian. The She, scattered over mountainous regions in the north, is the largest minority ethnic group of the province.

Many ethnic Chinese around the world, especially in Southeast Asia, trace their ancestries to the Fujianese branches of Hoklo people and Teochew people. Descendants of Southern Min speaking emigrants make up the predominant majority ethnic Chinese populations of Taiwan, Singapore, Australia, Brunei, Thailand, Indonesia and Philippines. While Eastern Min speaking people, especially Fuzhounese people, are one of the major sources of China immigrants in the United States, especially since the 1990s.

Religion 

The predominant religions in Fujian are Chinese folk religions, Taoist traditions, and Chinese Buddhism. According to surveys conducted in 2007 and 2009, 31.31% of the population believes and is involved in Chinese ancestral religion, while 3.5% of the population identifies as Christian. The reports did not give figures for other types of religion; 65.19% of the population may be either irreligious or involved in Chinese folk religion, Buddhism, Confucianism, Taoism, folk religious sects, and small minorities of Muslims.

In 2010, there are 115.978 Muslims in Fujian

Culture

Because of its mountainous nature and waves of migration from central China and assimilation of numerous foreign ethnic groups such as maritime traders in the course of history, Fujian is one of the most culturally and linguistically diverse places in China. Local dialects can become unintelligible within , and the regional cultures and ethnic composition can be completely different from each other as well. This is reflected in the expression that "if you drive five miles in Fujian the culture changes, and if you drive ten miles, the language does". Most varieties spoken in Fujian are assigned to a broad Min category. Recent classifications subdivide Min into
 Eastern Min (the former Northern group), including the Fuzhou dialect
 Northern Min, spoken in inland northern areas
 Pu-Xian, spoken in central coastal areas
 Central Min, spoken in the west of the province
 Shao-Jiang, spoken in the northwest
 Southern Min, including the Amoy dialect and Taiwanese
The seventh subdivision of Min, Qiong Wen, is not spoken in Fujian. Hakka, another subdivision of spoken Chinese, is spoken around Longyan by the Hakka people who live there.

As is true of other provinces, the official language in Fujian is Mandarin, which is used for communication between people of different localities, although native Fujian peoples still converse in their native languages and dialects respectively.

Several regions of Fujian have their own form of Chinese opera. Min opera is popular around Fuzhou; Gaojiaxi around Jinjiang and Quanzhou; Xiangju around Zhangzhou; Fujian Nanqu throughout the south, and Puxianxi around Putian and Xianyou County.

Fujian cuisine, with an emphasis on seafood, is one of the eight great traditions of Chinese cuisine. It is composed of traditions from various regions, including Fuzhou cuisine and Min Nan cuisine. The most prestigious dish is Fotiaoqiang (literally "Buddha jumps over the wall"), a complex dish making use of many ingredients, including shark fin, sea cucumber, abalone and Shaoxing wine (a type of Chinese alcoholic beverage).

Many well-known teas originate from Fujian, including oolong, Wuyi Yancha, Lapsang souchong and Fuzhou jasmine tea. Indeed, the tea processing techniques for three major classes of tea, namely, oolong, white tea, and black tea were all developed in the province. Fujian tea ceremony is an elaborate way of preparing and serving tea. The English word "tea" is borrowed from Hokkien of the Min Nan languages. Mandarin and Cantonese pronounce the word chá.

Nanyin is a popular form of music of Fujian.

Fuzhou bodiless lacquer ware, a noted type of lacquer ware, is noted for using a body of clay and/or plaster to form its shape; the body later removed. Fuzhou is also known for Shoushan stone carvings.

Tourism

Fujian is home to several tourist attractions, including four UNESCO World Heritage Sites, one of the highest in China.

Cultural features 
The Fujian Tulou are Chinese rural dwellings unique to the Hakka in southwest Fujian. They were listed by the UNESCO as one of the World Heritage Sites in 2008.

Gulangyu Island, Xiamen, is notable for its beaches, winding lanes, and rich architecture. The island is on China's list of National Scenic Spots and is classified as a 5A tourist attraction by the China National Tourism Administration (CNTA). It was listed by the UNESCO as one of the World Heritage Site in 2017. Also in Xiamen is the South Putuo Temple.

The Guanghua Temple is a Buddhist temple in Putian. It was built in the penultimate year of the Southern Chen Dynasty. Located in the northern half of the mouth of Meizhou Bay, it is about 1.8 nautical miles from the mainland and faces the Strait of Taiwan to the southeast. Covering an area of six square miles, the island is swathed in luxuriant green foliage. The coastline is indented with over 12 miles of the beach area. Another Buddhist temple, Nanshan Temple is located in Zhangzhou.

Although it is known as both a Hindu and Buddhist temple, on account of added Tamil-Hindu influences, the main statue in the most important hall is that of Vairocana Buddha, the main Buddha according to Huayan Buddhism.

In the capital of Fuzhou is the Yongquan Temple, a Buddhist temple built during the Tang dynasty.

The Chongwu Army Temple honors twenty-seven fallen soldiers of the People's Liberation Army who died during an attack by Nationalist forces in 1949, including five who died shielding a teenage girl during the attack. The site is frequented by locals and tourists.

Around Meizhou Islands is the Matsu pilgrimage.

Natural features 
Mount Taimu is a mountain and a scenic resort in Fuding. It offers a grand view of mountains and sea and is famous for its natural scenery including granite caves, odd-shaped stones, cliffs, clear streams, cascading waterfalls, and cultural attractions such as ancient temples and cliff Inscriptions.

The Danxia landform in Taining was listed by the UNESCO as one of the World Heritage Sites in 2010. It is a unique type of petrographic geomorphology found in China. Danxia landform is formed from red-coloured sandstones and conglomerates of largely Cretaceous age. The landforms look very much like karst topography that forms in areas underlain by limestones, but since the rocks that form danxia are sandstones and conglomerates, they have been called "pseudo-karst" landforms. They were formed by endogenous forces (including uplift) and exogenous forces (including weathering and erosion).

The Wuyi Mountains was the first location in Fujian to be listed by UNESCO as one of the World Heritage Sites in 1999. They are a mountain range in the prefecture of Nanping and contain the highest peak in Fujian, Mount Huanggang. It is famous as a natural landscape garden and a summer resort in China.

Notable individuals
The province and its diaspora abroad also have a tradition of educational achievement and have produced many important scholars, statesmen, and other notable people. These include people whose ancestral home (祖籍) is Fujian (their ancestors originated from Fujian). In addition to the below list, many notable individuals of Han Chinese descent in Taiwan, Southeast Asia, and elsewhere have ancestry that can be traced to Fujian.

Some notable individuals include (in rough chronological order):

Han, Tang, and Song dynasties
Baizhang Huaihai (720–814), an influential master of Chan Buddhism during the Tang Dynasty
Huangbo Xiyun (died 850), an influential master of Chan Buddhism during the Tang Dynasty
Chen Yan (849－892), Tang dynasty governor of Fujian
Liu Yong (987–1053), a famous poet
Cai Jing (1047–1126), government official and calligrapher who lived during the Northern Song dynasty
Li Gang (1083–1140), Song dynasty politician and military leader (ancestral home is Shaowu)
Zhu Xi (1130–1200), Confucian philosopher
Zhen Dexiu (1178–1235), Song dynasty politician and philosopher
Yan Yu (1191–1241), a poetry theorist and poet of the Southern Song dynasty
Chen Wenlong (1232–1277), a scholar-general in the last years of the Southern Song dynasty
Pu Shougeng (1250–1281), a Muslim merchant and administrator in the last years of the Southern Song dynasty
Yuan, Ming, and Qing dynasties
Chen Youding (1330–1368), Yuan dynasty military leader
Gao Bing (1350–1423), an author and poetry theorist during Ming Dynasty
Huang Senping (14th–15th century), royal son-in-law of Sultan Muhammad Shah of Brunei
Zhang Jing (1492–1555), Ming dynasty politician and general
Yu Dayou (1503–1579), Ming dynasty general and martial artist
Chen Di (1541–1617), Ming dynasty philologist, strategist, and traveler
Huang Daozhou (1585–1646), Ming dynasty politician, calligrapher, and scholar
Ingen (1592–1673), well-known Buddhist monk, poet, and calligrapher who lived during Ming Dynasty
Hong Chengchou (1593–1665), Ming dynasty official
Shi Lang (1621–1696), Qing dynasty admiral
Koxinga (1624–1662), Ming dynasty general who expelled the Dutch from Taiwan
Huang Shen (1687–1772), a painter during the Qing dynasty
Lin Zexu (1785–1850), Qing dynasty scholar and official
Chen Baochen (1848–1935), imperial preceptor of Qing dynasty
Zhan Shi Chai (1840s–1893), entertainer as "Chang the Chinese giant"
Huang Naishang (1849–1924), scholar, and revolutionary, discovered the town of Sibu in Sarawak, east Malaysia in 1901
Lin Shu (1852–1924), translator, who introduced the western classics into Chinese.
Yan Fu (1854–1921), scholar and translator
Sa Zhenbing (1859–1952), high-ranking naval officer of Mongolian origin
Zheng Xiaoxu (1860–1938), statesman, diplomat, and calligrapher
Qiu Jin (1875–1907), revolutionary and writer
Lin Changmin (1876—1925), a high-rank governor in the Beiyang Government
Liang Hongzhi (1882–1946), a high-rank governor in the Beiyang Government
Lin Juemin (1887–1911), one of 72 Revolutionary Martyrs at Huanghuagang, Guangzhou
Chen Shaokuan (1889–1969), Fleet Admiral who served as the senior commander of naval forces of the National Revolutionary Army
Huang Jun (1890–1937), writer
Hsien Wu (1893–1959), protein scientist
Lin Yutang (1894–1976), writer
Zou Taofen (1895–1944), journalist, media entrepreneur, and political activist
Zheng Zhenduo (1898–1958), literary historian
Lu Yin (1899–1934), writer
20th-21st century
Bing Xin (1900–1999), writer
Shu Chun Teng (1902–1970), scientist, researcher, and lecturer
Zhang Yuzhe (1902–1986), astronomer and director of the Purple Mountain Observatory
Hu Yepin (1903–1931), writer
Lin Huiyin (1904–1955), architect and writer
Go Seigen (1914–2014), pseudonym of Go champion Wú Qīngyuán
Lin Jiaqiao (1916－2013), a well-known mathematician
Wang Shizhen (1916－2016), nuclear medicine physician
Liem Sioe Liong (1916–2012), a Chinese-born Indonesian businessman of Fuqing origin, founder of Salim Group
Zheng Min (1920–2022), a scholar and poet
Ray Wu (1928–2008), geneticist
Chih-Tang Sah (born 1932), well-known electronics engineer of Mongolian origin
Chen Jingrun (1933-1996), a widely known mathematician who invented the Chen's theorem and Chen prime
Wang Wen-hsing (born 1939), writer
Liu Yingming (1940–2016), a mathematician and academician
Sun Shensu (born 1943), a geochemist and Ph.D. holder from the Columbian University (ancestral home is Fuzhou)
Chen Kaige (born 1952), film director (ancestral home is Fuzhou)
Chen Zhangliang (born 1961), a Chinese biologist, elected as vice-governor of Guangxi in 2007
Liu Yudong (born 1970), a professional basketball player
Shi Zhiyong (born 1980), professional weightlifter
Zhang Jingchu (born 1980), actress
Lin Dan (born 1983), professional badminton player
Jony J (born 1989), rapper and songwriter
Xu Bin (born 1989), actor and singer
Tian Houwei (born 1992), professional badminton player
Oho Ou (born 1992), actor and singer
Wang Zhelin (born 1994), professional basketball player
Qian Kun (born 1996), singer and songwriter
Zhang Yiming (born 1983), Internet entrepreneur, founder of ByteDance, TikTok's parent company.
Wang Xing (born 1979), Internet entrepreneur, founder of Meituan-Dianping.
Robin Zeng (born 1968), Tech entrepreneur, founder of Contemporary Amperex Technology Co. Limited (CATL).

Sports
Fujian includes professional sports teams in both the Chinese Basketball Association and the Chinese League One.

The representative of the province in the Chinese Basketball Association is the Fujian Sturgeons, who are based in Jinjiang, Quanzhou. The Fujian Sturgeons made their debut in the 2004–2005 season, and finished in seventh and last place in the South Division, out of the playoffs. In the 2005–2006 season, they tied for fifth, just one win away from making the playoffs.

The Xiamen Blue Lions formerly represented Fujian in the Chinese Super League, before the team's closure in 2007. Today the province is represented by Fujian Tianxin F.C., who play in the China League Two, and the Fujian Broncos.

Education and research
Fujian is considered one of China's leading provinces in education and research. As of 2022, two major cities ranked in the top 65 cities in the world (Fuzhou 50th and Xiamen 63th) by scientific research output, as tracked by the Nature Index.

High schools
Fuzhou Gezhi High School
Fuzhou No.1 Middle School
Fuzhou No.3 Middle School
Quanzhou No.5 Middle School
Xiamen Shuangshi High School
Xiamen No.1 Middle School
Xiamen Foreign Language School

Colleges and universities

National
Xiamen University (founded 1921, also known as University of Amoy, "985 project", "211 project") (Xiamen)
Huaqiao University (Quanzhou and Xiamen)

Provincial
Fuzhou University (founded 1958, one of "211 project" key Universities) (Fuzhou)
Fujian Agriculture and Forestry University (Fuzhou)
Fujian College of Traditional Chinese Medicine (Fuzhou)
Fujian Medical University (Fuzhou)
Fujian Normal University (founded 1907) (Fuzhou)
Fujian University of Technology (Fuzhou)
Xiamen University (Xiamen)
Jimei University (Xiamen)
Xiamen University of Technology (Xiamen)
Longyan University (Longyan)
Minnan Normal University (Zhangzhou)
Minjiang University (Fuzhou)
Putian University (Putian)
Quanzhou Normal College (Quanzhou)
Wuyi University (Wuyishan)

Private
 Yang-En University (Quanzhou)

See also 

 Major national historical and cultural sites in Fujian

Notes

References

Citations

Sources 
 Economic data

Economic profile for Fujian

External links

 
 
 Complete Map of the Seven Coastal Provinces from 1821 to 1850

 
Provinces of the People's Republic of China
East China